Roberta Allen is a conceptual artist and fiction writer. Her interest in language is the bridge that connects these separate pursuits. As a conceptual artist who combines images and text, she explores how language changes or informs our perception of images. Her works included drawings, artist books, photo/text works, installations, digital prints, and sculpture. Her works in the early 1970s were inspired by Kierkegaard’s belief that our deepest experiences occur in the form of contradictions and wherever there is contradiction humor is present. Through the 1970s, she exhibited alongside Sol LeWitt, Robert Ryman and Carl Andre, among others, at John Weber Gallery in New York. In her writing, which includes, among other books, three micro and short story collections, a novel, a novella and a travel memoir, Allen questions the way we perceive the world and the self. Truths are relative and may change in a flash. The way our minds work and specifically the act of relating is her main subject. She presents disturbing views of the human scene which are often relieved by humor.

Early life

Roberta Allen is a New York-based artist who was born and raised in New York, NY. At the age of twenty, she traveled alone to Europe and lived briefly in Athens, Amsterdam and Berlin, later in Mexico. Over the years, she traveled, often alone, to the Peruvian Amazon, Indonesia, Turkey, Egypt, Mali and countries in Central America. Her travels inspired many of her stories.

Art career

Allen began as a painter living in Amsterdam where she had her first one-person gallery exhibition in 1967. After several one-person shows in New York, she joined John Weber Gallery in 1973 and had one-person exhibitions there in 1974, 1975, 1977, and 1979. During this time, she also had one-person gallery exhibitions in Milan, Dusseldorf, Brussels, Munich and Rome. She had one-person museum exhibitions at MoMA P.S. 1, L.I.C., NY, 1977, 80; the Kunstforum, Städtische Galerie in Lenbachhaus, Munich, 1981, and The Perth Institute of Contemporary Arts, Perth, Western Australia, 1989. Her conceptual works, which combine image and text, include drawings, collages, artist books, photo/text series, and installations. She has been in over one hundred group exhibitions worldwide. After 1981, while continuing to make conceptual art and exhibiting intermittently, she preferred to stay outside the art world. In 2014, the Athenaeum Music & Arts Library in La Jolla, CA began a catalogue raisonne of her multiple edition 1970s artist books and a one-person exhibition of her 1970s art took place at Minus Space in Dumbo, Brooklyn. A one-person show of recent conceptual drawings and one-of-a-kind artist books took place at the Athenaeum in 2016. A one person exhibition, "Some Facts About Fear" took place in 2017 in Minus Space in Brooklyn.

Writing career

Allen began writing fiction in 1979 while making conceptual art. Her first stories were published in 1980 by Sun & Moon Press in the anthology Contemporary American Fiction (along with John Ashbery and Walter Abish, among others). Her first story collection was The Traveling Woman, (Vehicle Editions). Her other books are The Daughter, (Autonomedia), Certain People, (Coffee House Press); Amazon Dream (City Lights) Fast Fiction, (Story Press), The Playful Way to Serious Writing, The Playful Way to Knowing Yourself, (both Houghton Mifflin) and The Dreaming Girl (Painted Leaf, new edition Ellipsis Press). Her latest story collection is The Princess of Herself, published by Pelekinesis Press in 2017  . Her short shorts and short stories have appeared in over 300 literary magazines, including Conjunctions, Guernica, Bomb, The Brooklyn Rail, Open City, The Collagist, Gargoyle and in many anthologies, including Micro Fiction, published by W.W. Norton in 2017. She received the 2015 Honorable Mention for The Gertrude Stein Award for Fiction. She has been a Tennessee Williams Fellow in Fiction at the University of the South and a Yaddo Fellow.

Selected one person exhibitions
 2017 Minus Space, Brooklyn, NY  
 2016 Athenaeum Music & Arts Library, La Jolla, CA.
 2014 Minus Space, Brooklyn, NY
 1989 Perth Institute of Contemporary Arts, Perth, Western Australia
 1981 Galerie Walter Storms, Munich, Germany
 1981 Kunstforum, Stadt. Galerie im Lembachhaus, Munich, Germany
 1981 Galleria Primo Piano, Rome, Italy
 1980 P.S. 1 Museum, Long Island City, NY
 1979 John Weber Gallery, NYC
 1978 Hal Bromm Gallery, NYC
 1978 MTL Galerie, Brussels, Belgium
 1978 Fine Arts Center, C.W. Post College, Glenvale, LI., NY
 1977 Galerie Maier-Hahn, Dusseldorf, Germany
 1977 John Weber Gallery, NYC
 1977 Franklin Furnace, NYC
 1977 P.S. 1 Museum, Long Island City, NY
 1975 John Weber Gallery, NYC
 1974 John Weber Gallery, NYC
 1974 Galleria Toselli, Milan, Italy
 1967 Galerie 845, Amsterdam, Netherlands

Grants and fellowships
 2017-18 Long-listed for the Gordon Burn Prize for The Princess of Herself
 2017 Tree of Life Artist Grant
 2010 Virginia Center For The Creative Arts, Residency Fellowship, Amherst, VA
 2005 Virginia Center For The Creative Arts, Residency Fellowship, Amherst, VA
 1998 Tennessee Williams Fellow In Creative Writing/Writer In Residence, University of the South, Sewanee, TN
 1994 Virginia Center For The Creative Arts, Residency Fellowship, Amherst, VA
 1993 Yaddo Residency Fellowship, Saratoga Springs, New York
 1989 Artist-In-Residence Fellowship, Art Gallery of Western Australia, Perth, Western Australia
 1987 Yaddo Residency Fellowship, Saratoga Springs, New York
 1986 Virginia Center For The Creative Arts, Residency Fellowship, Amherst, VA
 1985 VCCA Residency Feliowship
 1985 LINE (NEA & NYS Council) Grant
 1983 Yaddo Residency Fellowship
 1978-79 CAPS (Creative Artists Public Service) Grant (Sculpture)
 1972 Ossabaw Island Project Residency Fellowship
 1971-72 MacDowell Colony Residency Fellowship

Multiple edition artist books

 Some Facts About Fear, published by the artist, Rome, 1981, limited edition
 Everything in the world there is to know is known by somebody, but not by the same knower, Ottenhausen Verlag, Munich, 1981, edition of 300
 Possibilities, John Weber Gallery & Parasol Press, 1977, edition of 1000
 Pointless Acts, Collation Center, NY 1977, edition of 1000
 Pointless Arrows, published by the artist, 197G, edition of 1000
 Partially Trapped Lines, Parasol Press, SA, 1975, limited edition of 200
 The Invisible Line of Limitation, Parasol Press, SA, 1975, limited edition of 200

Selected bibliography

 Silverblatt, Michael, "Roberta Allen: The Princess of Herself," Bookworm, KCRW Los Angeles, CA, March 22, 2018, live and online.
 Torri, Erika, Roberta Allen, Artists' Books Collection, Athenaeum Music & Arts Library, La Jolla, CA., May 2017, 64 pages.
 Zinnser, John, "Writing Anti-Stories: An Interview with Roberta Allen," Bomb Magazine, (Online), Oct. 11, 2017
 Seed, John, Clusters of Loose Geometries in Conceptual "Thought Drawings," Roberta Allen (Review), Hyperallergic, Nov. 10, 2016 online.
 Catalog of exhibition, Un Museo Ideale: The Collection of Bianca & Mario Bertolini, Museo del Novecento, Milan, Italy, 2015.
 Goodrich, Melissa, (Online Interview) "The Hair Stylist Who Fell Twenty Feet And Landed Upright: An Interview with Roberta Allen," The Collagist Blog, Dzanc Books, Jan. 22, 2014
 Vartanian, Hrag, Best of 2014: Our Top 10 Brooklyn Art Shows: #2 Roberta Allen: Works from the 1970s at Minus Space, Hyperallergic, Dec. 23, 2014, online.
 McConnell, Suzanne, “The Dreaming Girl,” Web Exclusive, The Brooklyn Rail, Feb. 2012
 Wynn Kramarshy / Amy Eshoo, Editor, 560 BROADWAy: A New York Drawing Collection at Work, 1991-2006, Fifth Floor Foundation with Yale University Press, 2008, pp 161, 177.
 Winters, Laura, “Certain People & Other Stories.” The New York Times Book Review, March 23, 1997, 18.
 Indiana, Gary, “Have Pain Will Travel.” The Village Voice, Books, December 23, 1986, 72.
 “Metaphor in Midocean.” “Noted With Pleasure,” (Excerpt) The New York Times Book Review, June 22, 1986, 39.
 Shaw, Janet, “Quicksilver Nightmares.” The New York Times Book Review, June 8, 1986, 36.
 Erweiteerte Fotografie/Extended Photography, catalog of exhibition at Wiener Secession, Vienna, Austria, 1981
 Rein, Ingrid, Paradoxa mit Pfeil und Fisch, Die Installationen von Roberta Allen, Suddeutsche Zeitung, April 27, 1981
 Skira Annuel, Art Actuel, 1979, Geneva, Statement by the artist, p 32
 O'Grady, Holly, The Paradoxical Arrow: Roberta Allen's Installations And Books, (article), Arts Magazine, February 1979, pp 156,157
 Lopes Cardozo, Judith, Roberta Allen (review) Artforum, February 1978, pp 73, 74
 Lubell, Ellen, Roberta Allen (review) Arts Magazine, October 1977, pp 23,24
 Deitch, Jeffrey, Roberta Allen, (article), Arts Magazine, June 1977, p 6
 Auping, Michael, New Work/New York catalog of exhibition at California State University, Los Angeles, 1976.
 Lubell, Ellen, Alighiero E. Boetti/Roberta Allen (review), Arts Magazine, April 1975, pp 19, 20
 Gilbert-Rolfe, Jeremy, Roberta Allen (review), Artforum, May 1974, p 69

Selected public collections
 Museum of Modern Art, NYC
 The Metropolitan Museum of Art, NYC
 The Cooper-Hewitt Museum, NYC
 Bibliotheque du France, Paris, France
 Cincinnati Art Museum, Cincinnati, Ohio
 Worcester Art Museum, Worcester, MA
 Stadtische Galerie im Lenbachhaus, Munich, Germany
 Art Gallery of Western Australia, Perth, Western Australia
 Wadsworth Athenaeum, Hartford, CT.
 Athenaeum, Music & Arts Library, La Jolla, CA
 Museo del Novecento, Milan, Italy

Teaching (writing)

Teaching positions include: The Writing Program, New School University from 1992 – 2010, Columbia University's School of the Arts, University of the South, Sewanee, TN, Parsons School of Design, NY, Summer Writers' Conference, Hofstra University, International Women's Writing Guild Conference, Skidmore College, Saratoga Springs, NY. Allen's private writing workshops began in 1991 and continue to the present.

References 

1945 births
Living people
Writers from New York City
Artists from New York City
American memoirists
American women memoirists
21st-century American women